Jara Saguier is the last name of several former football (soccer) players from Paraguay. Notable people with the surname include:

Alberto Jara Saguier
Ángel Jara Saguier
Carlos Jara Saguier
Darío Jara Saguier
Enrique Jara Saguier

See also 
Jara (surname)

Compound surnames